Lake Lachard, also spelled Lake La Chard, is an oval-shaped lake that is roughly  south of the eastern cove of Lake June in Winter. Lake Lachard is surrounded by the city of Lake Placid, Florida, yet the lake and a small bit of shore surrounding the lake are outside the city limits. Almost the entire shore of the lake is vacant land that in 2013 had been contoured by heavy equipment. On the southeast shore are four residences.

Lake Lachard is completely surrounded by private property, so there is no public access to it. The Take Me Fishing website says the lake contains largemouth bass, bluegill and grass carp.

References

Lakes of Highlands County, Florida
Lakes of Florida